The 1950 Major League Baseball All-Star Game was the 17th playing of the midsummer classic between the all-stars of the American League (AL) and National League (NL), the two leagues comprising Major League Baseball. The game was held on July 11, 1950, at Comiskey Park in Chicago the home of the Chicago White Sox of the American League. The game resulted in the National League defeating the American League 4–3 in 14 innings.  It was the first All-Star game to go into extra innings.

White Sox in the game
The White Sox hosted the game and were represented by pitcher Ray Scarborough, who did not appear in the game.

Starting lineups
Players in italics have since been inducted into the National Baseball Hall of Fame.

National League
 Willie Jones, 3b
 Ralph Kiner, lf
 Stan Musial, 1b
 Jackie Robinson, 2b
 Enos Slaughter, cf
 Hank Sauer, rf
 Roy Campanella, c
 Marty Marion, ss
 Robin Roberts, p

American League
 Phil Rizzuto, ss
 Larry Doby, cf
 George Kell, 3b
 Ted Williams, lf
 Walt Dropo, 1b
 Hoot Evers, rf
 Yogi Berra, c
 Bobby Doerr, 2b
 Vic Raschi, p

Umpires

The umpires changed assignments in the middle of the fifth inning – Pinelli to home, Rommel to first, Conlan to second, and McGowan to third.

Synopsis

Vic Raschi and Robin Roberts were the starting pitchers for the AL and NL, respectively.

The NL scored first in the top of the 2nd inning, pushing across 2 runs on a single by Jackie Robinson followed by a triple by Enos Slaughter, who then scored on a flyout by Hank Sauer.  The AL got 1 run back in the bottom of the 3rd inning, when Cass Michaels scored from third base on a flyout by George Kell.  The AL then pulled ahead 3–2 in the bottom of the 5th inning; with runners on second and third with one out, Bob Lemon scored from third base on a flyout by George Kell, and Larry Doby then scored on a single by Ted Williams.

There was no further scoring until the top of the 9th inning, when the NL's Ralph Kiner hit a home run off of AL reliever Art Houtteman, tying the score 3–3.  The NL benefitted from five innings of scoreless relief from Larry Jansen, who faced 16 batters striking out 6, while allowing just one hit.

In the top of the 14th, the NL's Red Schoendienst hit a home run off of AL reliever Ted Gray to put the NL ahead 4–3. In the bottom of the 14th, the AL's Joe DiMaggio came to bat with one out and a man on first, but with the crowd on its feet, DiMaggio grounded into a game-ending 5-4-3 double play.

The losing pitcher was the AL's Ted Gray.  The winning pitcher was the NL's Ewell Blackwell, who shutout the AL in the final three innings, while facing nine batters and giving up just a single.

References

External links
Baseball Almanac
Baseball-Reference.com

Major League Baseball All-Star Game
Major League Baseball All-Star Game
Major League Baseball All Star Game
July 1950 sports events in the United States
Baseball competitions in Chicago
1950s in Chicago